Scholars Academy is a four-year public high school institution located in Conway, South Carolina at Coastal Carolina University. The school was established as part of Horry County Schools for gifted education in 2003.

See also
Horry County Schools

Public high schools in South Carolina
Coastal Carolina University
Schools in Horry County, South Carolina
Buildings and structures in Conway, South Carolina